Barker Road is an intermediate station on the Peak Tram funicular railway line, and is located on Barker Road in the Peak, Central and Western District, Hong Kong,  above sea level. The station opened in 1888 along with the tramline. At this time it was named Plantation Road station as Barker Road was built not before 1898. Today, Barker Road itself passes under the tramway at the uphill end of the station on a bridge.

The station comprises a single platform on the western side of the single track. Barker Road is the only intermediate station to have a 'proper' station building, with a concrete roof covering the platform and track. This roof was not there from the start but was built in 1919. All other stations only have a small shelter on the platform.

Because the station is located in a high-income residential area, where most residents own a car, its patronage is relatively low. The station is a request stop at which tram cars will stop only if passengers have pressed the request button inside the tramcar or at the station. This facility is not offered during Sundays and Statutory Holidays, due to the increased demand on the tramway as a whole. No ticketing equipment is provided on the platform.

Neighbouring landmarks 
 Barker Road
 Old Peak Road
 Plantation Road
 Findlay Road
 Lions Pavilion

References

External links
 

Peak Tram stations
Railway stations in Hong Kong opened in 1888
Victoria Peak
Grade I historic buildings in Hong Kong